The 1984 World Sambo Championships were held in Madrid, Spain on June 1984. Championships were organized by FILA. According to certain sources, women also competed at the event.

Medal overview

References

External links 
Results on Sambo.net.ua

World Sambo Championships
1984 in sambo (martial art)
1984 in Spanish sport
International sports competitions hosted by Spain
Sports competitions in Madrid